Enza Zaden is a vegetable breeding company from Enkhuizen in North Holland, which produces vegetable seeds for the professional market. The company is one of the ten biggest vegetable breeding companies in the world and has over thirty subsidiaries and over 2,000 employees. Beside the main crops: tomato, pepper, cucumber and lettuce, Enza Zaden also breeds melon, onion, and many other vegetables. "Enza" is an abbreviation from the old name "Enkhuizer Zaadwinkel."

History 
Enza Zaden was founded in 1938 by Jacob Mazereeuw as "De Enkhuizer Zaadwinkel". Initially the company sold vegetable seeds, potatoes and legumes. In 1944, the company name was changed into "De Enkhuizer Zaadhandel". After the Second World War, the company focused entirely on professional breeding of vegetables.

In 1959, one of Jacob's sons, Piet, started the first plant breeding activities of the company. In 1962, his newly developed variety of tomato, "Extase", came on the market, and was very successful. The success which followed gave the company the opportunity to develop itself further.

In the 1980s, Enza expanded further internationally with plant breeding activities on Crete starting in 1984, a first foreign subsidiary in the United Kingdom in 1985, and a first R&D-station abroad (opened in 1987 in Italy). Today, the research sections and commercial subsidiaries of the company are established in all continents.

Activities 
The main activity of Enza Zaden is developing new vegetable varieties for domestic and foreign customers. Enza Zaden focuses on breeding for taste, looks, yield, labor friendliness and plant disease resistance. Enza Zaden breeds its products in the classical way, so without genetic modification. Enza Zaden does use advanced technologies in the breeding process.

The company offers fruit vegetables that include tomatoes, sweet peppers, cucumbers, melons, squash, pumpkins, hot peppers, and eggplants; and leafy vegetables that comprise lettuce, endive, corn salad, spinach, radicchio, chicory, and celery. It also provides allium that consists of leek and onions; root vegetables, such as radish, fennel, and celeriac; herbs, which include basil, celery cut, chervil, chive, Chinese chive, coriander, dill, parsley, and rucola; and brassicas, including cauliflower, kohlrabi, and broccoli.

Enza Zaden has a seed production company in Tanzania, Africa. There, and at other production locations, the company grows for sale. It has subsidiary locations in Argentina, Australia, Brazil, Bulgaria, Canada, China, France, Germany, India, Indonesia, Italy, Mexico, Morocco, New Zealand, Poland, Russia, South Africa, Spain, Tanzania, Turkey, the United States, and United Kingdom.

Enza Zaden is a part of the foundation Seed Valley, a partnership between companies in North Holland who are active in horticulture.

References

External links 
Enza Zaden Home Page

Agriculture companies of the Netherlands
Plant breeding
Agriculture companies established in 1938
Food and drink companies established in 1938
1938 establishments in the Netherlands
Dutch brands
Dutch companies established in 1938